Edmund Ernst Karl Sparmann (born 16 June 1888 in Vienna, Austria and died June 24, 1951 in Stockholm) was an aircraft designer and aeronautical inventor.

He created an aircraft factory in Stockholm, was an aircraft designer, created and patented several aeronautical inventions, served in the Austrian Army flying corps in the first world war and designed and built the P1 Sparmann airplane.

P 1 Sparmann 
The P 1, also known as the P 1 Sparmann or S 1-A ”Sparmannjagaren” was a trainer fighter created by Sparmann

References

External links 
P 1 - Sparmann S 1-A ”Sparmannjagaren” (1939-1947)
Edmund Sparmann at the Swedish Air Force Museum

1888 births
1951 deaths
Engineers from Vienna
Austro-Hungarian World War I pilots
Austrian aviators